The COVID-19 pandemic in Tokelau is part of the ongoing worldwide pandemic of coronavirus disease 2019 caused by severe acute respiratory syndrome coronavirus 2. Tokelau reported its first confirmed case on 21 December 2022.

Background 
On 12 January 2020, the World Health Organization (WHO) confirmed that a novel coronavirus was the cause of a respiratory illness in a cluster of people in Wuhan, Hubei Province, China, which was reported to the WHO on 31 December 2019.

The case fatality ratio for COVID-19 has been much lower than SARS of 2003, but the transmission has been significantly greater, with a significant total death toll.

Timeline
On 21 December 2022, Tokelau reported its first five cases of COVID-19.

COVID-19 vaccination efforts
On 19 July 2021, the Royal New Zealand Navy warship HMNZS Wellington delivered 120 vials of the Pfizer–BioNTech COVID-19 vaccine to Tokelau's Nukunonu atoll, which is sufficient to vaccinate 720 people. Tokelau's population was 1,499 according to the 2016 Census. By 2 August 2022, Tokelau had reported to the WHO that 998 vaccine doses had been administered.

See also
 COVID-19 pandemic in Oceania

References

 
Tokelau
Tokelau
Tokelau
Disasters in Tokelau